Adventures in Counter-Culture is a studio album by American hip hop musician Blueprint. It was released on April 5, 2011 on Rhymesayers Entertainment. All tracks were written and produced by Blueprint.

Critical reception
Adventures in Counter-Culture was met with "generally favorable" reviews from critics. At Metacritic, which assigns a weighted average rating out of 100 to reviews from mainstream publications, this release received an average score of 77 based on 4 reviews.

Track listing

Charts

References

External links

2011 albums
Blueprint (rapper) albums
Rhymesayers Entertainment albums